James Hubert Sadler (1830–1865) was an English first-class cricketer.

A club cricketer based around Leeds and Bradford,
Sadler made a single appearance in first-class cricket for the North in the North v South fixture of 1853 at The Oval. Batting twice in the match, he was dismissed for 3 runs in the North's first-innings by Edmund Hinkly, while in their second-innings he was dismissed for 6 runs by the same bowler. He later emigrated to the United States, where he represented a team made up of English residents. Sadler died at Brooklyn, New York in 1865, aged 34 or 35.

References

External links

1830 births
1865 deaths
Sportspeople from Mansfield
Cricketers from Nottinghamshire
English cricketers
North v South cricketers
English emigrants to the United States